Shri Swaminarayan Temple, Wheeling is a Swaminarayan Hindu temple located in the Chicago suburb of Wheeling. It comes under the International Swaminarayan Satsang Mandal (Laxmi Narayan Dev Gadi) of the Swaminarayan Sampraday. The temple is also a member of the International Swaminarayan Satsang Organisation.

Opened on 26 May 1991 by Acharya Shree Ajendraprasadji Maharaj, it is built on two acres of land.

Built at a cost of $1.7 million, it is a tri-spire temple with the spires adorning the front edge of the flat topped building. Surrounded by industrial structures, it is a square-shaped, cream coloured structure with a big prayer hall that caters to a 40,000 strong community and is run entirely by volunteers. The image of Swaminarayan is worshipped in pictorial form along with other avatars of Narayana.

See also

 Swaminarayan

Notes

References

External links
 Official Swaminarayan Temple Wheeling website
 Official Laxmi Narayan Dev Gadi website

Hindu temples in Illinois
Religious buildings and structures in Cook County, Illinois
Religious buildings and structures completed in 1991
Swaminarayan temples
1991 establishments in Illinois
Buildings and structures in Cook County, Illinois
Asian-American culture in Illinois
Indian-American culture in Illinois